Philippe Marois (born 13 October 1980) is a Canadian speed skater. He competed in the men's 1500 metres event at the 2002 Winter Olympics.

References

1980 births
Living people
Canadian male speed skaters
Olympic speed skaters of Canada
Speed skaters at the 2002 Winter Olympics
Sportspeople from Quebec
21st-century Canadian people